The 2014 Tokyo Marathon was the eighth edition of the annual marathon race in Tokyo, Japan and was held on Sunday, 23 February. An IAAF Gold Label Road Race, it was the first World Marathon Majors event to be held that year and represented the second occasion that the Tokyo race was part of the elite-level marathon series.

Both elite race winners set new course records: Dickson Chumba ran a men's record of 2:05:42 and Tirfi Tsegaye's run of 2:22:23 was a women's record.

Pre-race build up
Following on from the Tokyo Marathon's induction into the World Marathon Majors circuit, high calibre and international fields were invited for the men's and women's elite races. In the men's race, invitees included Tadese Tola (2013 world medallist), Abel Kirui (a two-time world champion), Peter Some (2013 Paris Marathon winner), Dickson Chumba (2013 Eindhoven Marathon winner), and former Tokyo champion Michael Kipyego. In total, seven of the invited men's field had personal bests faster than two hours and six minutes. Arata Fujiwara was the most prominent domestic starter.

In the women's division, Lucy Wangui Kabuu was the fastest entrant with her best of 2:19:34 hours. Second fastest was Japan's Yoko Shibui (2:19:41) although the 35-year-old was not expected to reach her past performance. A group of Ethiopian women were among the other prominent entrants, including Tirfi Tsegaye, Atsede Baysa, Birhane Dibaba and Merima Mohammed.

Results
Dickson Chumba of Kenya won the men's race in a course record time of 2:05:42 hours. This also made it the fastest time ever recorded in the city, bettering Gert Thys's record of 2:06:33 set at the defunct Tokyo International Marathon. In the women's race, Ethiopia's Tirfi Tsegaye topped the podium with a course record of 2:22:23 hours – an improvement of over three minutes on the previous record.  
The wheelchair races had mainly domestic entrants and Hiroyuki Yamamoto and Wakako Tsuchida were the best of the men's and women's divisions, respectively.

Men

Other notable performers
Cyrus Njui: 14th (2:09:35)
Abderrahime Bouramdane: 16th (2:12:09)
Mekubo Mogusu: 25th (2:16:43)
Arata Fujiwara: 76th (2:30:58)
Yared Asmerom: DNF

Women

Other notable performers
Yoko Shibui: 85th (3:11:05)
Olena Shurkhno: DNF
Merima Mohammed: DNF

Wheelchair men

Wheelchair women

References

Race results
Results 2014 Tokyo Marathon Man . Tokyo Marathon. Retrieved on 2014-03-24.
Results 2014 Tokyo Marathon Woman . Tokyo Marathon. Retrieved on 2014-03-24.
Results マラソン車いす男子／Marathon:Wheelchair(Men) . Tokyo Marathon. Retrieved on 2014-03-24.
Results マラソン車いす女子／Marathon:Wheelchair(Women) . Tokyo Marathon. Retrieved on 2014-03-24.

External links

Official website
Participation data 

Tokyo Marathon
Tokyo
2014 in Tokyo
Tokyo Marathon
Tokyo Marathon